The 2010–11 Serie A1 is the 92nd season of the Serie A1, Italy's premier Water polo league.

Seasons in Italian water polo competitions
Italy
Serie A1
Serie A1
2010 in water polo
2011 in water polo